V. Uvarov was a Soviet set decorator. He was nominated for an Academy Award for Best Art Direction for his work in the epic film War and Peace (1967).

References

External links

Set decorators
Year of birth missing
Possibly living people
Soviet people